Mayo Gaels GAA Club (CLG Gael Mhuigheo) is a Gaelic football club located in Mayo Abbey, Claremorris, County Mayo. The club draws players from the parishes of Mayo Abbey, Facefield and Ballyglass. Mayo Gaels' club colours are blue and yellow.

References

External sources
Club Website

Gaelic football clubs in County Mayo
Gaelic games clubs in County Mayo